Alexandra Rose Mahon (born October 1973) is a British businesswoman. She has been the chief executive of Channel 4 since October 2017, succeeding David Abraham as the first female CEO of the channel.

Early life
Alexandra Rose Mahon was born in October 1973 in London. Aged five, she moved to Edinburgh, and grew up there with her mother and stepfather. She was educated at St Margaret's School, Edinburgh.

She has a PhD in medical physics from Imperial College London, awarded in 1998.

Career
In 2005, when working for Talkback Thames, Management Today included Mahon in their top 35 women under 35 in the business world.

Mahon was CEO of the production company Shine Group, owned by 21st Century Fox, and then CEO of the visual effects software company Foundry.

She has worked with the UK's Department of Culture, Media and Sport (DCMS), as a member of their advisory panel on the BBC's future direction.

Mahon's appointment as CEO of Channel 4 was announced in June 2017 and became effective the following October.

Personal life
Mahon is married to Richard Barker, who works in renewable energy; the couple have four children. The family live in Paddington, London.

References

1973 births
Living people
Alumni of Imperial College London
People educated at St Margaret's School, Edinburgh
Scottish people of Irish descent
British television executives
Channel 4 people